Lokanja Vas is a small village in the Municipality of Slovenska Bistrica in northeastern Slovenia. It lies on the left bank of the Ložnica River south of Slovenska Bistrica itself on the local road leading to the town's railway station. The area is part of the traditional region of Styria. It is now included with the rest of the municipality in the Drava Statistical Region.

References

External links
Lokanja Vas at Geopedia

Populated places in the Municipality of Slovenska Bistrica